(The Goose of Cairo or The Cairo Goose, K. 422) is an incomplete Italian opera buffa in three acts, begun by Wolfgang Amadeus Mozart in July 1783 but abandoned in October. The complete libretto by Giambattista Varesco remains. Mozart composed seven of the ten numbers of the first act, plus some recitative, as well a sketch for a further aria; the extant music amounts to about 45 minutes.

Background
Mozart's correspondence shows he wanted to write a comic opera to a new text for the Italian company in Vienna. He had only just met Lorenzo Da Ponte, who would later pen the libretti for several of Mozart's most successful operas, but Da Ponte was not available, so Mozart turned to Giambattista Varesco, librettist for Mozart's earlier opera Idomeneo. Mozart's urgent need of a poet is attested by his willingness to work with someone, who in his opinion had "not the slightest knowledge or experience of the theatre". Eventually Mozart realized the hopelessness of the project and abandoned Varesco's libretto after six months because of its silly ending, a farcical travesty of the Trojan Horse legend.

Performance history
Several versions have been prepared by adapting other music. The first performance (in concert) was in Frankfurt in April 1860 with numbers taken from Lo sposo deluso and some concert arias.

The first stage performance was given on 6 June 1867 in Paris at Louis Martinet's Théâtre des Fantaisies-Parisiennes in a 2-act French adaptation, L'oie du Caire, by the Belgian librettist , who added a new conclusion, and a musical arrangement by the conductor, Charles Constantin, who orchestrated the music and added other pieces by Mozart to complete it.

Fragments from L'oca del Cairo, Lo sposo deluso, and Der Schauspieldirektor have been combined as Waiting for Figaro, performed in 2002 by the Bampton Classical Opera. Lund added three muses commenting on the absurdity of the plot, highlighting the librettist's arbitrariness and thus commenting on the historical events leading to the opera being left uncompleted.

Roles

Synopsis
Don Pippo, a Spanish Marquess, keeps his only daughter Celidora locked up in his tower. She is betrothed to Count Lionetto, but her true love is Biondello, a wealthy gentleman. Biondello makes a bet with the Marquis that if he can rescue Celidora from the tower within a year he wins her hand in marriage.
He succeeds by having himself smuggled into the tower garden inside a large mechanical goose.

Noted arias
 "" – Chichibio, scene 1
 "" – Auretta, scene 1
 "" – Don Pippo, scene 3

Recordings 
 1991 – Dietrich Fischer-Dieskau (Pippo), Edith Wiens (Celidora), Peter Schreier (Biondello), Douglas Johnson (Calandrino), Pamela Coburn (Lavina), Anton Scharinger (Chichibio), Inga Nielsen (Auretta) – Carl Philipp Emanuel Bach Chamber Orchestra, Peter Schreier – CD Philips Classics. This was recorded in 1991 specifically for the Complete Mozart Edition, a project that Philips had started earlier that year. This recording was placed in Volume 39, paired with the previously recorded Lo sposo deluso.
 2007 – Lo sposo deluso, L'oca del Cairo and other fragments by W. A. Mozart, with Ann Murray, Marianne Hamre, Graham Smith, Josef Wagner, Marisa Martins, Jeremy Ovenden, Matthias Klink, Silvia Moi, Miljenko Turk, Malin Hartelius and the Camerata Salzburg conducted by Michael Hofstetter. DVD of the live performance at the 2006 Salzburg Festival (Deutsche Grammophon 0734250)
 2018 – L'oca del Cairo & Lo sposo deluso, Herman Bekaert (baritone), Rolande van der Paal (soprano), Ioan Micu (tenor), Bernard Loonen (tenor), Leonie Schoon (soprano), Gretje Anthoni (soprano), Romain Bischoff (baritone); Kameropera Antwerpen, Hans Rotman; CPO

Notes

Sources

External links
 
 
 Libretto (composed numbers only) and Dramatis Personæ, opera.stanford.edu

Oca del Cairo
Italian-language operas
Opera buffa
Unfinished operas
1783 operas
Operas